Paežeriai Manor may refer to:

 Paežeriai Manor (Šiauliai)
 Paežeriai Manor (Vilkaviškis)